Brunello may refer to:

Brunello, Lombardy, a municipality in Italy
Brunello (character), a fictional dwarf in the romantic epics Orlando innamorato and Orlando furioso
Brunello Cucinelli (company), an Italian luxury fashion brand
Brunello di Montalcino, a wine from Tuscany
Brunello (grape), the name used near Montalcino for a Sangiovese clone 
Brunellopoli, a scandal involving producers of the wine, also known as Brunellogate

People 
Brunello (given name), given name
Brunello (surname), surname

See also
Brunelli
Brunelleschi (disambiguation)